Arun Kumar Shukla is an Indian structural biologist and the Joy-Gill Chair professor at the department of biological sciences and bioengineering at the Indian Institute of Technology, Kanpur. Known for his studies on G protein-coupled receptor, Shukla is a Wellcome Trust-DBT Intermediate Fellow and a recipient of the SwarnaJayanti Fellowship of the Department of Science and Technology. The Department of Biotechnology of the Government of India awarded him the National Bioscience Award for Career Development, one of the highest Indian science awards, for his contributions to biosciences, in 2017/18. He received the 2021 Shanti Swarup Bhatnagar Prize for Science and Technology in Biological Science.

Biography 

Dr. Arun Kumar Shukla was born on 01 November 1981 in Kushinagar in the Indian state of Uttar Pradesh, earned his master's degree in biotechnology from Jawaharlal Nehru University after which he did his doctoral studies under the guidance of Hartmut Michel (Nobel Laureate, 1988) of Max Planck Institute of Biophysics. His post-doctoral work was with Robert J. Lefkowitz (Nobel Laureate, 2012) of Duke University and Brian Kobilka (Nobel Laureate, 2012) of Stanford University and he started his career at Duke University as an assistant professor at their department of medicine. Returning to India, he joined the Indian Institute of Technology, Kanpur (IITK) at the Department of Biological Sciences and Bioengineering (BSBE) where he holds the position of a professor and heads the Laboratory of GPCR Biology.

Shukla is known to have carried out extensive research on G protein-coupled receptor and his research is reported to have led to easier regulation of these receptors for better drug efficacy. He led a team of IITK scientists who developed nanomachines which could be designed to selectively target signalling events inside living cells. The technique developed by them is in use with several drugs that are available in the market such as Telmisartan, Olmesartan, Fexofenadine, Propanolol, and Metoprolol. He has published a number of articles and has contributed chapters to books published by others; Google Scholar, an online repository of scientific articles has listed 75 of them.

Awards and honours 
Shukla received the 2021 Shanti Swarup Bhatnagar Prize for Science and Technology in Biological Science. The Department of Biotechnology of the Government of India awarded him the National Bioscience Award for Career Development, one of the highest Indian science awards, for his contributions to biosciences, in 2017/18. He has also received the B. M. Birla Science Prize (2017), NASI-Young Scientist Platinum Jubilee Award of the National Academy of Sciences, India (2016), CDRI Award (2018), Shakuntala Amir Chand Prize of the Indian Council for Medical Research (2018) and the EMBO Young Investigator Award (2017). He was elected as a fellow of the Indian National Science Academy in 2022.

Selected bibliography

See also 

 Cell signaling
 Arrestin
 Membrane proteins

Notes

References

Further reading

External links 
 

Indian scientific authors
Year of birth missing (living people)
N-BIOS Prize recipients
People from Kanpur
Jawaharlal Nehru University alumni
Max Planck Society alumni
Duke University alumni
Duke University School of Medicine faculty
Stanford University alumni
Academic staff of IIT Kanpur
Indian biologists
Living people